Mariategui JLT Corredores de Seguros S.A. is a Peruvian company dedicated to insurance brokerage since 1987. It belongs to the Jardine Lloyd Thompson Group.  
Its main office is located in the city of Lima, with additional offices in the cities of  Piura (Department of  the same name), Chiclayo (Department of Lambayeque), Trujillo (Department of La Libertad), Arequipa and Tacna (Department of the same name).

Background 
Mariategui JLT was created in 1987, and  the Reinsurance office—today JLT Peru—was established in 1989. At present, Mariategui JLT has more than 90 professionals dedicated to insurance brokerage specializing in corporate insurance. 
En 1997, Mariategui & Asociados associated with Heath Lambert, working with them for  7 years. In November, 2004, Mariategui JLT signed the strategic alliance with the Jardine Lloyd Thompson Group, one of  the largest  insurance and reinsurance brokers in the world, with affiliates in more than 130 countries, and which main office is located in Europe.

Areas 
Property & Casualty: a property insurance policy that takes care of  covering the loss suffered as a result of an insured risk, within the property of  the insurance holder.
Human Risks: A personal insurance policy offering fast indemnity of a loss owing to or  an event affecting the welfare of  the insured parties.  It may cover one individual or a group.

Mariategui JLT and the Decentralized 2011 Tournament 
On February 10, 2011 during a press conference offered by the Asociación Deportiva de Fútbol Profesional (ADFP) (Professional Football Sports Association) an announcement was made regarding the agreement that  Mariategui JLT and ACE Seguros had entered into to make personal accident insurance available to Peruvian football fans, to offer them protection before and during the  matches of  the “Movistar Cup” Decentralized Tournament, a benefit for every fan  buying a ticket of  admission to a game.

Certifications and Acknowledgements  
 ISO 9001 : The Mariategui JLT Corredores de Seguros S.A. Quality Managing System was certified in August, 2005 and re-certified in August, 2008 having besides the certifications of UKAS (United Kingdom Accreditation Service) of  the United Kingdom for all the processes of the services granted.
 Award to Business Creativity  2010, in the Category of  Banking, Insurance and Financing, granted by the Universidad Peruana de Ciencias Applicadas (UPC). This award was granted to  ATP Partners SAC and Mariategui JLT Corredores de Seguros S.A. for their Strategic Alliance to renew the fleet of taxis in Lima and raise the quality of life of taxi drivers. It was considered that an integrated insurance system had been created that made it possible for taxi drivers to have access to credit and thus, improve the taxi fleet.
Great Place to Work Award 2010: Every year, the Great Place to Work Institute of Peru, awards the companies which have best improved its labor policies, with respect to the previous year.

References

Insurance companies of Peru
Companies based in Lima